Nour Nayef Mansour (born 22 October 1989) is a Lebanese footballer who plays as a centre-back for  club Ahed and the Lebanon national team. Known for his defensive capabilities, Mansour also offers good attacking options through his aerial threat.

Coming through the youth system, Mansour started his career with Safa, with whom he won two league titles, one FA Cup, one Elite Cup, and one Super Cup. In 2016 he moved to reigning Lebanese Premier League champions Ahed, where he won the 2019 AFC Cup. Mansour played for Lebanon internationally, and was part of the squad that participated in the 2019 AFC Asian Cup.

Club career

Safa 
Coming through the youth system, Nour Mansour started his career with Safa, where he became the captain several years later. With Safa he won the Lebanese Premier League twice, the FA Cup once, the Elite Cup once and the Super Cup once.

Ahed 

In 2016, he transferred to Lebanese Premier League champions Ahed for a reported $200,000 deal. Only available for the AFC Cup in the 2015–16 season, his club debut came on 23 February, when he played against Altyn Asyr. The following match, played on 8 March 2016, he scored against Al-Wehdat in a 3–2 home win in the AFC Cup.

His first league game for Ahed came on 9 September 2016 against his former club Safa, with his team winning 1–2 away. His first league goals came in the form of a brace against Racing, on 23 October 2016, in a 3–1 home win. In his second season with Ahed, he played 19 games and scored five. He also won the Lebanese Premier League, and was part of the Lebanese Premier League Team of the Season. The following season, Mansour won the domestic treble with Ahed, winning the league, FA Cup and Super Cup. He played 20 games and scored four, and was part of the Team of the Season for the second time in a row.

In the 2018–19 season, Mansour won his fifth Lebanese Premier League, the third (in a row) with Ahed, and the Lebanese Super Cup. He played a total of 15 league games. On 4 November 2019, Mansour helped Ahed win the 2019 AFC Cup, defeating April 25 in the final: this was the first time in history a Lebanese side had won the competition.

International career 

Mansour made his debut for the Lebanon national team on 3 March 2010, in a 4–0 away loss against Syria. His first international goal came on 6 November 2014, against the United Arab Emirates in a 3–2 away defeat. Mansour was called up for the 2019 AFC Asian Cup squad, where he played against North Korea in the final match of the group stage, won by Lebanon 4–1.

Style of play 
Mansour is known for his tackling and reading of the game, specializing in last-second interventions. He also offers great attacking options for a defender, playing at the center of a back-three as a ball-playing centre-back. Furthermore, Mansour has an eye for goal through his aerial presence in set pieces and the occasional penalty kick.

Career statistics

International 

Scores and results list Lebanon's goal tally first, score column indicates score after each Mansour goal.

Honours 
Safa
 Lebanese Premier League: 2011–12, 2012–13
 Lebanese FA Cup: 2012–13
 Lebanese Elite Cup: 2012
 Lebanese Super Cup: 2013

Ahed
 AFC Cup: 2019
 Lebanese Premier League: 2016–17, 2017–18, 2018–19, 2021–22
 Lebanese FA Cup: 2017–18, 2018–19
 Lebanese Elite Cup: 2022; runner-up: 2021
 Lebanese Super Cup: 2017, 2018, 2019

Individual
 Lebanese Premier League Team of the Season: 2013–14, 2016–17, 2017–18

See also
 List of Lebanon international footballers

References

External links

 
 Nour Mansour at RSSSF
 
 
 
 

1989 births
Living people
Lebanese footballers
People from Tripoli District, Lebanon
Association football central defenders
Safa SC players
Al Ahed FC players
Lebanese Premier League players
Lebanon youth international footballers
Lebanon international footballers
2019 AFC Asian Cup players
AFC Cup winning players